Federal Route 111, or Jalan Tanjung Rhu (formerly Kedah state route K33), is a major federal road in Langkawi Island, Kedah, Malaysia. The Kilometre Zero of Federal Route 111 starts at Tanjung Rhu.

Features

 Air Hangat beach
 Tanjung Rhu

List of junctions and town

References

Malaysian Federal Roads
Roads in Langkawi